Kithaur is a town and a nagar panchayat in Meerut district in the Indian state of Uttar Pradesh.

Demographics
 India census, Kithaur had a population of 23,510. Males constituted 52% of the population and females 48%, and 21% of the population was under 6 years of age. Kithaur had an average literacy rate of 42%, lower than the national average of 59.5%, with 52% of males and 32% of females literate.

Education
There is no Degree college in kithaur so the young children have to travel to other places to get the education.

Health
There is no Government Hospital in Kithaur so the patients have to travel 26 kilometers to get the treatment.

References

Cities and towns in Meerut district